The 2004 Swiss Figure Skating Championships (officially named  and ) were held in Neuchâtel from December 18 through 20th, 2003. Medals were awarded in two disciplines of men's singles and ladies' singles.

Senior results

Men
Michael Ganser of Germany was a guest competitor who finished 5th.

Ladies
Kristin Wieczorek of Germany and Anne-Sophie Pichon of France were guest competitors who finished 3rd and 6th respectively.

External links
 results

Swiss Figure Skating Championships
Swiss Figure Skating Championships, 2004